Ayva tatlısı is a dessert from Turkish cuisine that is made with quince. The quince is cooked by boiling in water or in the oven with cloves, sweet syrup and filled with apple or quince meal, and raisins and topped with kaymak. It is served as halves with the inside slightly carved out. The dish is eaten warm and cold throughout Turkey, particularly in wintertime.

See also
List of Turkish desserts

References

Turkish desserts